Attila Mizsér (born 28 April 1961) is a Hungarian modern pentathlete and Olympic champion.

Olympics
Attila Mizsér participated on the Hungarian team which won a gold medal at the 1988 Summer Olympics in Seoul. He won an individual silver medal at the 1992 Summer Olympics in Barcelona.

Awards
Mizsér was elected Hungarian Sportsman of the Year in 1985, and Hungarian Modern Pentathlete of the Year in 1985, 1990 and 1992. The Olympic gold-winning pentathlon team, of which Mizsér was a member, was elected Hungarian Team of the year in 1987, 1988 and 1989. Mizsér also received International Fair Play Award in 1995.

Personal life
Mizsér married Edina Éri in 1991. They have four children: Alexa (born 1992), Melissa (born 1994), Márk (born 2003) and Norina (born 2010).

References

1961 births
Living people
Hungarian male modern pentathletes
Olympic modern pentathletes of Hungary
Modern pentathletes at the 1988 Summer Olympics
Modern pentathletes at the 1992 Summer Olympics
Olympic gold medalists for Hungary
Olympic silver medalists for Hungary
Olympic medalists in modern pentathlon
World Modern Pentathlon Championships medalists
Medalists at the 1992 Summer Olympics
Medalists at the 1988 Summer Olympics
Sportspeople from Budapest
20th-century Hungarian people
21st-century Hungarian people